Clathrus delicatus is a species of fungus in the stinkhorn family. It is known from Sri Lanka and India.

References

Phallales
Fungi described in 1873
Fungi of Asia
Taxa named by Miles Joseph Berkeley
Taxa named by Christopher Edmund Broome